Speed is a 2015 South Korean melodrama film written and directed by South Korean indie provocateur Lee Sang-woo. It made its world debut at the 16th Jeonju International Film Festival and its North American premiere in Austin at the 11th Fantastic Fest in 2015.

Synopsis
It tells the story of four high school friends and the dark side of youth as they continues their headlong leap into adulthood.

Cast
 Seo Jun-young as Lee Choo-won
 Baek Sung-hyun as Ma Goo-rim 
 Choi Tae-hwan as Sung Dae-sung
 Byun Jun-suk as Choi Seo-won 
 Shin Seo-hyun as Eun-ae  
 Im Hyung-joon as Teacher Park
 Lee Sang-ah as Mi-ja
 Lee Sang-woo as Rapist/Itaewon club kiss man

Reception

References

External links
 
 
 

2015 films
South Korean drama films
2010s Korean-language films
Films directed by Lee Sang-woo
2010s South Korean films